Cheungbeia laterculata is a species of sea snail, a marine gastropod mollusk in the family Pseudomelatomidae, the turrids and allies

Description
The length of the shell attains 22 mm, its diameter 7.5 mm.

Distribution
This species occurs in the China Seas, off Vietnam, Southeast India and off the Gulf of Carpentaria to Queensland, Australia

References

 Sowerby II, G. B. (1870). Descriptions of forty-eight new species of shells. Proceedings of the Zoological Society of London. (1870): 249–259
 Schepman, M.M. 1913. Toxoglossa. pp. 384–396 in Weber, M. & de Beaufort, L.F. (eds). The Prosobranchia, Pulmonata and Opisthobranchia Tectibranchiata, Tribe Bullomorpha, of the Siboga Expedition. Monograph 49. Siboga Expeditie 32(2)
  Hedley, C. 1922. A revision of the Australian Turridae. Records of the Australian Museum 13(6): 213–359, pls 42–56 
 Li B.Q., Kilburn R.N., & Li X.Z. (2010). Report on Crassispirinae Morrison, (Mollusca: Neogastropoda: Turridae) from the China Seas. Journal of Natural History. 44, 699–740

External links
 
 Image of Cheungbeia laterculata; Li, Bao Quan, Kilburn, Richard N. and Li, Xin Zheng(2010) 'Report on Crassispirinae Morrison, 1966(Mollusca: Neogastropoda: Turridae) from the China Seas', Journal of Natural History, 44: 11, 699–740

laterculata
Gastropods described in 1870